Věteřov is a municipality and village in Hodonín District in the South Moravian Region of the Czech Republic. It has about 500 inhabitants.

History
The first written mention of Věteřov is from 1141.

References

Villages in Hodonín District
Moravian Slovakia